The senators of the College of Justice are judges of the College of Justice, a set of legal institutions involved in the administration of justice in Scotland. There are three types of senator: Lords of Session (judges of the Court of Session); Lords Commissioners of Justiciary (judges of the High Court of Justiciary); and the Chairman of the Scottish Land Court. Whilst the High Court and Court of Session historically maintained separate judiciary, these are now identical, and the term Senator is almost exclusively used in referring to the judges of these courts.

Senators of the college use the judicial courtesy title of Lord or Lady along with a surname or a territorial name. Note, however, that some senators have a peerage title, which would be used instead of the senatorial title. All senators of the college have the honorific, The Honourable, before their titles, while those who are also privy counsellors or peers have the honorific, The Right Honourable. Senators are made privy counsellors upon promotion to the Inner House.

Under section 11 of the Treason Act 1708, it is treason to kill a Senator of the College of Justice "sitting in Judgment in the Exercise of their Office within Scotland".

History
Henry Lauder, Lord St Germains, King's Advocate, was one of the nine advocates appointed at the institution of the College of Justice.

Originally, some officers of state were included as senators, including the Lord Advocate, Lord Clerk Register, Master of Requests and the Secretary of State.

List of senators
The Court of Session Act 1988, when enacted, limited the number of senators of the College of Justice (aside from the chairman of the Scottish Land Court, who ranks as a senator) to 24. This was subsequently increased to 25 in 1991, 27 in 1993, 32 in 1999, 34 in 2004, 35 in 2016, and most recently 36 by The Maximum Number of Judges (Scotland) Order 2022. The current judges are as follows.

Inner House
The Lord President is the president of the First Division, and the Lord Justice Clerk is the president of the Second Division.

Outer House

Retired judges
There are also some retired judges who still sit occasionally in the Court of Session or the Court of Criminal Appeal to hear cases if needed when there is a shortage of available judges. They are also called senators of the College of Justice. As of 2022, 7 retired judges are available to sit as judges:

See also 
 Historic list of senators of the College of Justice
 Justice of the Supreme Court of the United Kingdom
 List of judges of the Court of Appeal of England and Wales
 List of High Court judges of England and Wales

Notes

References

External links 
 Biographies of Senators

 
Judiciary of Scotland
College of Justice
Lists of judges in Scotland